Deon Carolus (born 10 July 1978) is a South African cricketer. He played in 74 first-class, 53 List A, and 12 Twenty20 matches in 1970/71.

References

External links
 

1978 births
Living people
South African cricketers
Eastern Province cricketers
Griqualand West cricketers
Warriors cricketers
Cricketers from Port Elizabeth